Deeper the Wound is a split album between American band Converge and Japanese band Hellchild. The album was released through Deathwish Inc. in America on April 23, 2001. Deeper the Wound was also the first album released through Deathwish. It was later released by Bastardize Records in Japan in 2006. The album features one new track from each artist, one cover song from each artist, and a few live versions of previously released tracks. The new track "Thaw" was later re-recorded and released on Converge's 2001 album, Jane Doe.

Track listing
Converge
 "Thaw" – 4:18
 "Clean" (Depeche Mode cover) – 6:03
 "Conduit" (live) – 3:50
 "Shallow Breathing" (live) – 0:57
 "Locust Reign" (live) – 1:32

Hellchild
  "1" – 4:22
 "Insurrection of the Living Damned" (Bulldozer cover) – 6:37
 "In This Freezing Night" (live) – 4:18
 "Without Any Answers" (live) – 3:08

Personnel
Production 
 Kurt Ballou – production, engineering
 Jacob Bannon – production
 Hellchild – production

Artwork and design
 Jacob Bannon – art direction, design
 Derek Hess – illustrations, cover/inside art
 Florian Bertmer - illustrations, inside/back art

References

Split albums
Converge (band) albums
Deathwish Inc. albums
2001 albums
Albums with cover art by Jacob Bannon
Albums produced by Kurt Ballou